Several units of the Royal Canadian Navy that have been named HMCS Beauharnois.

  (I), a  renamed Prestonian before commissioning, that served in the Battle of the Atlantic during the Second World War.
  (II), a  that served in the Battle of the Atlantic during the Second World War.

Battle honours

 Atlantic, 1944–45

References

 Government of Canada Ships' Histories - HMCS Beauharnois

Royal Canadian Navy ship names